The 2021 Players Championship (officially the 2021 Cazoo Players Championship) was a professional ranking snooker tournament, that took place from 22 to 28 February 2021 at the Marshall Arena in Milton Keynes. It was the 11th ranking event of the 2020–21 snooker season.

Judd Trump was the defending champion, having defeated Yan Bingtao 10–4 in the 2020 final. However, Trump lost 6–5 in the first round to Stuart Bingham.

The final was contested between John Higgins and Ronnie O'Sullivan, their first meeting in a ranking final since the 2005 Grand Prix, with Higgins winning 10–3. It was the 31st ranking title of Higgins's career, his first in three years, and he lost only four frames on his way to the title. This was O'Sullivan's 57th ranking final, equalling Stephen Hendry's record. There was a total of 30 century breaks made during the tournament, the highest of which was a 144 made by O'Sullivan in the final.

Prize fund
The breakdown of prize money for the 2021 tournament is shown below:

 Winner: £125,000
 Runner-up: £50,000
 Semi-final: £30,000
 Quarter-final: £15,000
 Last 16: £10,000 (Prize money received at this stage will not count towards prize money rankings)
 Highest break: £10,000
 Total: £385,000

Seeding list
The seedings were conducted on the basis of the one-year ranking list up to and including the 2021 Welsh Open.

Tournament draw

Final

Century breaks
Total: 30

 144, 125, 124, 110, 103  Ronnie O'Sullivan
 143, 109, 109  Barry Hawkins
 142, 138, 133, 127, 122, 121, 108, 100  John Higgins
 142, 135, 132, 130, 101  Neil Robertson
 130, 126, 119, 102  Kyren Wilson
 113, 112  Stuart Bingham
 109  Zhou Yuelong
 105  Judd Trump
 100  Martin Gould

References

External links 
 World Snooker |Players Championship

2021
Players Championship
Snooker competitions in England
Players Championship
Players Championship
Players Championship (snooker)